817 Annika (prov. designation:  or ) is a background asteroid in the region of the Eunomia family, located in the central portion of the asteroid belt. It was discovered on 6 February 1916, by German astronomer Max Wolf at the Heidelberg-Königstuhl State Observatory in southwest Germany. Any reference of the asteroid's name to a person is unknown.

Orbit and classification 

Annika is a non-family asteroid of the main belt's background population when applying the hierarchical clustering method (HCM) to its proper orbital elements by Nesvorný as well as by Milani and Knežević (AstDyS). In the 1995 HCM-analysis by Zappalà, however, Annika is a member of the Eunomia family, a prominent family of stony asteroids and the largest one in the intermediate main belt with more than 5,000 members. It orbits the Sun in the central main-belt at a distance of 2.1–3.1 AU once every 4 years and 2 months (1,523 days; semi-major axis of 2.59 AU). Its orbit has an eccentricity of 0.18 and an inclination of 11° with respect to the ecliptic. The body's observation arc begins with its official discovery observation at Heidelberg Observatory on 6 February 1916.

Naming 

"Annika" is a common German feminine given name. Any reference to a person or occurrence for the naming of this minor planet is unknown.

Unknown meaning 

Among the many thousands of named minor planets, Annika is one of 120 asteroids for which no official naming citation has been published. All of these asteroids have low numbers, the first being . They were discovered between 1876 and the 1930s, predominantly by astronomers Auguste Charlois, Johann Palisa, Max Wolf and Karl Reinmuth.

Physical characteristics 

In the Tholen-like taxonomy of the Small Solar System Objects Spectroscopic Survey (S3OS2), Annika is a common, stony S-type asteroid, while in the SMASS-like taxonomic variant of the S3OS2 survey, it is an Sl-subtype which transitions from the S-type to the uncommon L-type asteroid.

Rotation period 

In October 2002, a rotational lightcurve of Annika was obtained from photometric observations by Colin Bembrick at Mount Tarana Observatory , Australia, in collaboration with Greg Bolt and Tom Richards near Perth and Melbourne, respectively. Lightcurve analysis gave a well-defined rotation period of  hours with a brightness variation of  magnitude. This period was confirmed by Gérald Rousseau in March 2012, who determined a very similar period of  hours with an amplitude of  magnitude.

Diameter and albedo 

The Collaborative Asteroid Lightcurve Link derives an albedo of 0.2062 and a diameter of 22.20 kilometers based on an absolute magnitude of 10.6.

These timed observations are taken when the asteroid passes in front of a distant star. However, these two observations have received a poor quality rating.

References

External links 
 Lightcurve Database Query (LCDB), at www.minorplanet.info
 Dictionary of Minor Planet Names, Google books
 Asteroids and comets rotation curves, CdR – Geneva Observatory, Raoul Behrend
 Discovery Circumstances: Numbered Minor Planets (1)-(5000) – Minor Planet Center
 
 

000817
Discoveries by Max Wolf
Named minor planets
000817
19160206